The Boquer Valley  is a scenic valley running  north-east from the town of Port de Pollença, Majorca, to the sea at Cala Boquer. It is popular with bird-watchers for its migratory birds and resident Blue Rock Thrushes.

The ridge on the south-east side includes a peak called El Morral, which reaches .

The valley is only accessible by foot. The inland end is marked by a finca called Finca Boquer. The Roman city of  Bocchoris, which gives name to the valley, presumably lay here.

References 

Valleys of Spain
Landforms of the Balearic Islands